Mount Rigby is a mountain, 950 m, standing 2 nautical miles (3.7 km) northwest of Mount Hastings, just west of the mouth of Scott Glacier, in the Karo Hills. First observed and roughly mapped by the Byrd Antarctic Expedition, 1928–30. Named by Advisory Committee on Antarctic Names (US-ACAN) for John F. Rigby, geologist at McMurdo Station, summer 1965–66.
 

Mountains of the Ross Dependency
Amundsen Coast